Felice Gabrielli, O.F.M. Conv. (died 1684) was a Roman Catholic prelate who served as Bishop of Nocera de' Pagani (1659–1684).

Biography
Felice Gabrielli was born in Capradosso, Italy in 1603 and ordained a priest in the Order of Friars Minor Conventual.
On 22 September 1659, he was appointed during the papacy of Pope Alexander VII as Bishop of Nocera de' Pagani.
On 28 September 1659, he was consecrated bishop by Giovanni Battista Maria Pallotta, Cardinal-Priest of Santa Maria in Trastevere. 
He served as Bishop of Nocera de' Pagani until his death on 1 September 1684.

References

External links and additional sources
 (for Chronology of Bishops) 
 (for Chronology of Bishops) 

17th-century Italian Roman Catholic bishops
Bishops appointed by Pope Alexander VII
1659 births
1684 deaths
Conventual Franciscan bishops